Susan Minford (born 3 December 1954) is an Irish former professional tennis player.

Minford comes from Northern Ireland and was associated with the Windsor club in Belfast.

Active on tour in the 1970s, she was a Wimbledon junior runner-up and played two years of Federation Cup tennis for Ireland. Her Federation Cup career included a win over West German Katja Ebbinghaus in 1972.

References

External links
 
 
 

1954 births
Living people
Irish female tennis players
Sportswomen from Northern Ireland